Lindsay Hairston (born December 8, 1951) is a retired professional basketball player who spent one season in the National Basketball Association (NBA) as a member of the Detroit Pistons during the 1975–76 season.

Born in Detroit, Michigan, Hairston played high school basketball at Kettering High School in Detroit before playing collegiately for Michigan State, averging 19.3 ppg and 11.5 rpg in his senior season (1974–75), and was twice named first-team All-Big Ten.  

Controversially, Hairston was one of a number of black players who walked out on Michigan State coach Gus Ganakas before a key Big Ten game on January 4, 1975 against Indiana.  Ganakas elected to start Jeff Tropf, who was white, 10 black players, led by team captain Hairston, walked out of the team meeting, returned for the game but were then suspended by Ganakas.  Michigan State lost the game 107–55 with a patchwork roster that included junior varsity players.  Tropf led the team with 21 points. The players would meet with Ganakas the next day, aired a number of grievance, were reinstated after apologizing, and then defeated Ohio State 88–84 the next day.  Tropf would transfer to Central Michigan at the end of the season.

Hairston was selected by the Pistons during the fourth round (64 pick overall) of the 1975 NBA Draft, spending one season with the hometown NBA team, averaging 5.8 ppg in the 1975-76 Detroit Pistons season.  He went on to play in France for several years, winning the FIBA Korać Cup in 1984 as a member of the team of Élan Béarnais Pau-Orthez.

References

External links

 Lindsay Hairston – player profile on cholet-basket.com 

Living people
1951 births
American expatriate basketball people in France
American men's basketball players
Basketball players from Detroit
Cholet Basket players
Chorale Roanne Basket players
Detroit Pistons draft picks
Detroit Pistons players
Élan Béarnais players
Kettering High School alumni
Michigan State Spartans men's basketball players